Luke Isakka (born 1 November 1980 in Sydney, New South Wales) is an Australian former professional rugby league footballer who played in the 2000s. Isakka played junior rugby league for Mascot Jets. He previously played for the Wests Tigers in the National Rugby League competition in Australia. Isakka primarily played at lock-forward.

He also had a short spell in England in 2004 with Leigh (Heritage № 1230).

References

1980 births
Living people
Australian rugby league players
Australian expatriate sportspeople in England
Leigh Leopards players
Rugby league locks
Rugby league players from Sydney
Wests Tigers players